Genanlu-ye Hasan Soltanlu (also Romanized as Genānlū Ḩasan Solṭānlū; also known as Genānlū, Ghenānlū, and Gonānlū) is a village in Keyvan Rural District, in the Central District of Khoda Afarin County, East Azerbaijan Province, Iran. At the 2006 census, its population was 36, in 7 families.

References 

Populated places in Khoda Afarin County